Don't Come Home a Drinkin' (With Lovin' on Your Mind) is the ninth solo studio album by American country music singer-songwriter Loretta Lynn. It was released on February 6, 1967, by Decca Records.

Critical reception 

In the issue dated February 18, 1967, Billboard published a review of the album that said, "Top country stylist assembled a winning program of good country tunes, old and new, and delivers them in her own distinct style. Her touching performance of "There Goes My Everything" is contrasted by the rhythm arrangement of "The Devil Gets His Dues" and "I Got Caught". Bound to be a sales giant."

Cashbox also published a review in the February 18 issue which said, "Loretta Lynn has taken the title of her current smash single "Don’t Come Home a Drinkin' (With Lovin’ on Your Mind)" for her new LP and come up with a package that all of her fans should be eager to hear. Besides the title song, Loretta offers such well known country tunes as "There Goes My Everything", "The Shoe Goes on the Other Foot Tonight", and "I'm Living in Two Worlds". Should be a big one for Loretta here."

AllMusic gave the album a positive review, rating it five stars and calling her choice of cover versions as something that "suits her perfectly", including her cover version of Ernest Tubb's "The Shoe Goes on the Other Foot Tonight".

Commercial performance 
The album peaked at No. 1 on the US Billboard Hot Country Albums chart. The album also peaked at No. 80 on the US Billboard Top LP's chart. The album was the first by a female country singer to be certified Gold by the RIAA.

The album's only single, "Don't Come Home a Drinkin' (With Lovin' on Your Mind)" was released in October 1966 and peaked at No. 1 on the US Billboard Hot Country Singles chart, becoming Lynn's first No. 1 single.

Recording
Recording for the album took place at Bradley's Barn in Mount Juliet, Tennessee, over four sessions, beginning on July 16, 1966. Three more sessions would follow on October 3, October 5, and November 17. "Saint to a Sinner" was recorded during the November 15, 1965 session for 1966's I Like 'Em Country, at Columbia Recording Studio in Nashville.

Track listing

Personnel
Adapted from the album liner notes and Decca recording session records.
Harold Bradley – electric bass guitar
Owen Bradley – producer
David Briggs – piano
Hal Buksbaum – cover photo
Fred Carter Jr. – guitar
Floyd Cramer – piano
Ray Edenton – acoustic guitar
Buddy Harman – drums
Junior Huskey – bass
The Jordanaires – background vocals
Loretta Lynn – lead vocals
Grady Martin – guitar, lead electric guitar
Johnny Russell – guitar
Hal Rugg – steel guitar
Joe Zinkan – bass

Charts
Album

Singles

Certifications

References 

1967 albums
Loretta Lynn albums
Albums produced by Owen Bradley
Decca Records albums